Rafiullah Bidar is the regional director of the Afghan Independent Human Rights Commission in Gardez.

The Afghan Independent Human Rights Commission was set up with funding from the United States Congress. In an interview with the UK newspaper The Guardian Bidar said:

According to the National Public Radio, Bidar was educated in Russia.

Bidar maintains extensive records of exit interviews he conducts with released prisoners, because American authorities will not allow him to interview captives currently in detention.

References

Afghan politicians
Living people
Year of birth missing (living people)